Parmotrema anchietanum is a species of saxicolous lichen in the family Parmeliaceae. Found in South America, it was described as new to science in 2008. The holotype was collected on the rocky shore of Anchieta Island in São Paulo; the lichen is named after the type locality. Secondary compounds present in the lichen include atranorin and chloratranorin in the cortex, and salazinic acid and consalazinic acid in the  medulla.

See also
List of Parmotrema species

References

anchietanum
Lichen species
Lichens described in 2008
Lichens of Brazil
Taxa named by John Alan Elix